Konalai is a village in Manachanallur Taluk, Tiruchirappalli District, in the Indian state of Tamil Nadu. It is 67 meters above sea level with good road connections amidst a network of rivers and waterways north of the Kolladam River. The state capital of Chennai is 331 km northeast with the district headquarters of Tiruchirappalli 22 km to the south and Manachanallur Taluk 14 km southwest. The nearest major railway station to Konalai is in Tiruchirappalli.

Demographics 
In 2011, Konalai was inhabited by 1109 families of which 9.9% (110) of the population were children under age six.        

The local language is Tamil. Tamil is widely spoken throughout the Taluk.

Education 
The Dr. G. Sakunthala College of Nursing, the Universal Teacher Training Institute, Trichy Engineering College, and St. Therasa's Aid are near Konalai. Due to these institutions of higher education, the results yielded are a higher literacy rate for the village (86.81%) relative to the Tamil Nadu region (80.09%). Male literacy (92.31%) exceeds female literacy (81.70%). The schools are mostly run by government.

Attractions 
The St. Antony of Padua Church is approximately 116 years old and belongs to the Kumbakonam Diocese. Two festivals are held at the church each year, on 19–21 January and on 12–13 June.

Nearby villages and cities 
Konalai is surrounded by Lalgudi Taluk towards the south, Tiruchirappalli Taluk. Thiruverambur Taluk lies to the South, and Pullambadi Taluk lies to the East. Some notable cities near Konalai include Lalgudi, Tiruchirappalli, Thuraiyur, and Perambalur.

References

Villages in Tiruchirappalli district